The Boston mayoral election of 1903 occurred on Tuesday, December 15, 1903. Democratic candidate and incumbent Mayor of Boston Patrick Collins defeated Republican candidate George N. Swallow, and two other contenders, to win a second term. 

Under legislation adopted in June 1903, this was the first Boston municipal election with "caucuses, henceforth to be called primaries", which were held on Thursday, November 19, 1903.

Inaugural exercises were held on Monday, January 4, 1904.

Results

Democratic primary
 Patrick Collins, Mayor of Boston since 1902, former member of the United States House of Representatives (1883–1889), Massachusetts Senate (1870–1871), and Massachusetts House of Representatives (1868–1869)
 Frederick S. Gore, member of the Massachusetts Senate

Republican primary
 E. Peabody Gerry, physician, age 56, former Boston Alderman (1900)
 Michael J. Murray, lawyer, age 36
 George N. Swallow, grocer, age 49, former chairman of the Boston Republican Committee (1899), Governor's councilor (1888–1889), state senator (1894), and state representative (1889–1891)
Source:

Other candidates
 William H. Carroll, Socialist Labor
 George W. Galvin, physician and head of the Wage Earners Emergency and General Hospital, Socialist
Galvin received all 423 votes cast in his party's primary election for mayor.

General election

See also
List of mayors of Boston, Massachusetts

References

Further reading
 

1903
Boston
Boston mayoral
1900s in Boston